Kolbanargjógv is a village on the western coast of the Faroese island of Eysturoy in the Sjóvar municipality. The 2007 population was 39. Its postal code is FO 495.

See also
 List of towns in the Faroe Islands

Populated places in the Faroe Islands